The short term Archos 5 might mean:
 the Archos Generation 6 based Archos 5 Internet Media Tablet
 the Archos Generation 7 based Archos 5 Internet Tablet